Committee on Military Affairs may refer to:

United States House Committee on Military Affairs
United States Senate Committee on Military Affairs